The term euthyna (plural euthynai), meaning straightening, was the examination of accountability which every public officer underwent on the expiration of his office in Classical Greece. At Athens the examination had two parts; the logos ('statement of account'), concerned the handling of public money and dealt with by a board of ten logistai (accountants), and the euthynai proper, an opportunity to raise any other objection to one's conduct in office, dealt with by a board of ten euthynoi (straighteners) appointed by the boule. These officials could dismiss accusations or pass them on to the courts.

References 
 John Roberts (2005). Dictionary of the Classical World. Oxford

Ancient Greek law
Economy of ancient Greece